Geraldo Washington Regufe Alves (born 8 November 1980) is a Portuguese retired professional footballer who played as a central defender.

Club career

Portugal
Born in Póvoa de Varzim, Alves finished his football development at hometown's Varzim SC. He signed with Primeira Liga giants S.L. Benfica in 1999, appearing in five league games over the course of two seasons while being mainly registered with the reserves in the third division.

When first-team opportunities proved few, Alves moved to fellow league club S.C. Beira-Mar in January 2002, where he was irregularly used. After a season with Gil Vicente F.C. he joined F.C. Paços de Ferreira, experiencing his most steady career period: in the 2006–07 campaign, as they achieved a first-ever qualification to the UEFA Cup, he played 28 matches and added two goals, all in a 2–1 home win over C.D. Nacional on 7 April 2007.

AEK Athens
On 5 June 2007, Alves signed a three-year deal worth €1.3 million with AEK Athens FC, where younger brother Bruno had previously played, loaned by FC Porto. In a 20 September UEFA Cup match against FC Red Bull Salzburg, he scored his first goal for the side in a 3–0 home win (3–1 on aggregate).

A starter in his debut season, Alves lost his spot in 2008–09 to Swedish international Daniel Majstorović.

Later career

On 5 July 2010, Alves joined FC Steaua București on a free transfer, signing a two-year contract. He made his Liga I debut on the 25th, against FC Universitatea Cluj.

Alves netted his first two official goals for Steaua on 5 April 2011, in a 5–0 home defeat of FC Unirea Urziceni in the league, with his team eventually ranking fifth and qualifying to the Europa League. In June 2012, he was released by the club due to his high salary.

On 18 August 2012, Alves agreed to stay in Romania, penning a two-year deal with FC Petrolul Ploiești. He eventually gained team captaincy.

On 3 September 2017, the 36-year-old Alves announced his retirement from professional football.

Personal life
Alves' younger brother, Bruno, was also a footballer and a central defender. He had paternal Brazilian ancestry, his father Washington Geraldo Dias Alves having played ten years of his career in Portugal – mainly with Varzim – where his children were born.

The youngest sibling, Júlio, was also a footballer, in the midfielder position. Their uncle, Geraldo Assoviador, also played the sport.

Alves married a Romanian woman, with the couple having one daughter.

Honours
Paços Ferreira
Segunda Liga: 2004–05

AEK Athens
Greek Football Cup runner-up: 2008–09

Steaua București
Cupa României: 2010–11
Supercupa României runner-up: 2011

Petrolul Ploiești
Cupa României: 2012–13
Supercupa României runner-up: 2013

Astra Giurgiu
Liga I: 2015–16
Supercupa României: 2016
Cupa României runner-up: 2016–17

References

External links
Official Steaua profile  

1980 births
Living people
People from Póvoa de Varzim
Portuguese people of Brazilian descent
Sportspeople from Porto District
Portuguese footballers
Association football defenders
Primeira Liga players
Liga Portugal 2 players
Segunda Divisão players
S.L. Benfica B players
S.L. Benfica footballers
S.C. Beira-Mar players
Gil Vicente F.C. players
F.C. Paços de Ferreira players
Super League Greece players
AEK Athens F.C. players
Liga I players
FC Steaua București players
FC Petrolul Ploiești players
FC Astra Giurgiu players
Portuguese expatriate footballers
Expatriate footballers in Greece
Expatriate footballers in Romania
Portuguese expatriate sportspeople in Greece
Portuguese expatriate sportspeople in Romania